Johann Christoph Besch (March 20, 1937 – February 27, 2011) was a German politician of the Christian Democratic Union (CDU) and former member of the German Bundestag.

Life 
Johann Christoph Besch was head of the scientific service of the Bundestag. He was a member of the Bundestag for the CDU as successor to Karl Carstens from 3 July 1979.

Literature

References

1937 births
2011 deaths
Members of the Bundestag for Schleswig-Holstein
Members of the Bundestag 1976–1980
Members of the Bundestag for the Christian Democratic Union of Germany